Aylott is a surname. Notable people with the surname include:

Steve Aylott (born 1951), English footballer
Trevor Aylott (born 1957), English footballer